Willow Spring (or Willow Springs) is an unincorporated community in southeastern Wake, and western Johnston counties, North Carolina, United States, which is covered by a shared post office. As of 2014, the population was 15,768 with population density of 379 base in NC Sperling's data. The Frank and Mary Smith House and Turner and Amelia Smith House, both listed on the National Register of Historic Places, are located in Willow Spring. Black Creek, part of the Neuse River, runs through Willow Spring. There are wetlands such as swamp and marsh surrounding the creek.

Climate
Willow Spring has a humid subtropical climate. Summertime average temperatures range between 90-97 degrees, sometimes rising into the 100s. Average wintertime temperatures range between 55-65 degrees, sometimes rising into the mid-80s.

Demographics

There are five people per square mile (population density). The median age is 33.8, while the US median is 37.6. A total of 65.75% of people in Willow Spring (27592) are married, while 7.95% are divorced.

The average household size is 2.7 people. A total of 34.73% of people are married, with children; 6.77% have children.

The previous entry referred to "Willow Spring" in Wake County, not "Willow Springs" in Johnston County.

Notable people
 Clara Leach Adams-Ender, retired US Army officer who was Chief of the United States Army Nurse Corps from September 1987 to August 1991
 Margaret Ann Jones - American philanthropist and businesswoman.

References

External links
 Willow Springs at the U.S. Geographic Names Information System
 A general page of details

Unincorporated communities in North Carolina
Research Triangle
Unincorporated communities in Wake County, North Carolina